Rubella is an infection caused by rubella virus.

Rubella may also refer to:
Rubella virus, the pathogenic agent of rubella
Rubella vaccine, a vaccine against rubella
Rubella Ballet, an English anarcho-punk band

See also